Balboa may refer to:

Boats
 Balboa 16, an American sailboat design
 Balboa 20, an American sailboat design
 Balboa 21, an American sailboat design
 Balboa 22, an American sailboat design
 Balboa 23, an American sailboat design
 Balboa 24, an American sailboat design

Places 
 Balboa, Cauca, a town and municipality in Colombia
 Balboa, León, a Spanish village and municipality
 Balboa, Panama, a port city in Panama
 Balboa District of Panamá Province in Panama
 Balboa, Risaralda, a town and municipality in Colombia
 Balboa (Los Angeles Metro station), on the Los Angeles Metro Orange Line
 Balboa (lunar crater), located near the western limb of the Moon
 Balboa High School (California), an American public high school of San Francisco, California
 Balboa Island, Newport Beach, California, a harborside community in Newport Beach
 Balboa Park (disambiguation), any of several
 Balboa Peninsula, Newport Beach, California, a neighborhood of the city of Newport Beach
 Naval Medical Center San Diego, a US Navy medical treatment facility informally known as "Balboa Hospital"

People 
 Vasco Núñez de Balboa ( 1475 – 1519), a Spanish explorer, governor, and conquistador
 Javier Balboa (born 1985), football midfielder
 Marcelo Balboa (born 1967), American former soccer defender
 Álex Balboa (born 2001), football midfielder

Entertainment 
 Balboa (dance), a close embrace style of swing dancing
 Balboa (band), a hardcore band from Philadelphia
 Balboa County, a fictional county setting for the Veronica Mars television series
 Rocky Balboa, protagonist of the Rocky film series
 Balboa, the merged tribe name in Survivor: Pearl Islands
 Balboa, a probe featured in Alien Planet

Other uses 
 Balboa (bug), a genus of dirt-colored seed bugs
 Balboa Line, a former train route in California, U.S.
 Panamanian balboa, the official currency of Panama

See also
 Rocky Balboa (disambiguation)